Amira Kheris (born 25 January 1999) is an Algerian canoeist. She competed in the women's K-1 200 metres and the K-1 500 metres  events at the 2020 Summer Olympics.

References

External links
 

1999 births
Living people
Algerian female canoeists
Canoeists at the 2020 Summer Olympics
Olympic canoeists of Algeria
Competitors at the 2019 African Games
African Games competitors for Algeria
21st-century Algerian people